Eser Yağmur (born 29 May 1983) is a Turkish professional footballer who last played as a striker for Kartalspor. He has played for the Süper Lig sides Beşiktaş, Bursaspor, Konyaspor and Denizlispor.

He has also been capped by the Turkey U-20 and U-21 squads.

References

1983 births
Living people
Turkish footballers
Turkey under-21 international footballers
Beşiktaş J.K. footballers
Elazığspor footballers
Diyarbakırspor footballers
Bursaspor footballers
Karşıyaka S.K. footballers
Konyaspor footballers
Kayseri Erciyesspor footballers
Denizlispor footballers
TKİ Tavşanlı Linyitspor footballers
Kartalspor footballers
Turkey youth international footballers
Association football forwards
Süper Lig players
TFF First League players